

Randy O'Brien

Blackjack O'Hare

Blackjack O'Hare is a fictional anthropomorphic hare in Marvel Comics. The character, created by Bill Mantlo and Sal Buscema, first appeared in The Incredible Hulk #271 (May 1982).

Blackjack O'Hare is a mercenary and leader of the Black Bunny Brigade. He was hired by Judson Jakes and Lord Dyvyne to kidnap Lylla, the C.E.O. of Mayhem Mekaniks. He planned on betraying his employers by marrying Lylla and inheriting the company, but was found out. He was rescued by Rocket Raccoon and after a series of incidents that caused him to question his own loyalty, he aided Rocket in defeating the tyrants and left with his new friends to start a new life.

All this appeared to be false when Rocket visited Halfworld and discovered that Blackjack, along with Lylla and Wal Rus, were all actually service animals for the mental patients who inhabited the planet. Blackjack married Lylla after Rocket left to ensure the imprisonment of a dangerous criminal.

However, this story was immediately retconned as Blackjack returned as a mercenary and adversary to Rocket and Groot. Blackjack was once again working for Dyvyne with his next assignment being that he kidnap Princess Lynx. Rocket, Groot and Wal Rus arrived to defeat Blackjack, his brigade and Dyvyne, once again.

He turned up again, disguised as an impostor Rocket and framing him for a series of murders. He reveals his identity to Rocket and claims that the reason for framing him was that he ruined his chance to assassinate Princess Amalya and destroyed his reputation in the process. Amalya had become a "General" and arrived with Rocket's ex's in an effort to exterminate him themselves. Blackjack considered the possibility of assassinating her now, but was shot by Amalya because he was talking out loud. As a last ditch effort he fires a missile at Rocket, but it gets deflected and Blackjack is presumably killed.

Blackjack O'Hare in other media
 Blackjack O'Hare appears in the Guardians of the Galaxy episode "We Are Family," voiced by David Sobolov.
 Blackjack O'Hare appears in the Rocket & Groot shorts.
 In the Marvel Super Hero Adventures episode "The Claws of Life," Blackjack is voiced by Sam Vincent.

Alfie O'Meggan

Seymour O'Reilly

Solomon O'Sullivan

Obituary

Obliterator

Oblivion
Oblivion is a cosmic entity associated with the concept of the void.

Obnoxio the Clown

Occulus

Ocean

Ocelot

 Genji Odashu

Oddball

Elton Healey

Orville Bock

Odin

Aleta Ogord

Ogre

Ogress

Okkara
Okkara was believed to be a sentient island located in the South Pacific that served as the nation for the 2nd generation of Mutants in the ancient times, until the Twilight Sword of Amenth split it into two separate beings, Krakoa and Arakko. Later it was revealed that Okkara actually began life two billion years ago as the human mutant named Grove, one of the 1st generation mutants that belongued to a thriving society known as the Threshold. Calling themselves the "Enriched", the Thresholders were attacked by the Unbreathing, an anaerobic form of life to whom oxygen was deadly. To combat the Unbreathing the Thresholders engineered sentient bacteria Arkea and Sublime, but they went out of control and turned upon the Threshold, infecting their bodies to use as hosts.
Grove herself was gravely injured in battle but survived through her mutant gift, to heal by vegetative growth which changed her from an almost human form with small sprouts into a fully bark-covered form. Having much changed, Grove took on the new name of Okkara.

Okoye

Okoye is a member of the Dora Milaje in Marvel Comics. The character, created by Christopher Priest and Mark Texeira, first appeared in Black Panther (vol. 3) #1 (November 1998).

She joined alongside her friend Nakia to be among T'Challa's wives-in-training. However, when Okoye discovered that T'Challa had no interest in marrying either of them, she immediately came to accept this. She has since stood at T'Challa's side preferring only to speak in Hausa. Okoye accompanied T'Challa when he recruited Queen Divine Justice. She was also with T'Challa when they tested Kasper Cole on whether he was worthy of the Black Panther garb. Okoye herself tested Kasper if he would stay with his pregnant girlfriend or leave her for Okoye.

Okoye in other media

Television
 Okoye had a silent cameo in Avengers: Earth's Mightiest Heroes. She appears as part of T'Challa's Dora Milaje.

Film
Danai Gurira portrays Okoye in the Marvel Cinematic Universe.
 Okoye appears in Black Panther where she is the head of the Dora Milaje. She has the utmost respect for T'Challa and the nation of Wakanda and is the lover of W'Kabi. She stands beside T'Challa for the majority of the film, but is forced to switch her allegiance to Erik Killmonger when he usurps the throne. After seeing that T'Challa is alive, and thus still legally King with the personal combat challenge incomplete, she leads the Dora to fight against Killmonger the moment he invalidates his own claim by refusing to continue the challenge. During W'Kabi's fight with M'Baku, Okoye eventually convinces W'Kabi to stand down causing those fighting alongside him to also stand down.
 Okoye returns in Avengers: Infinity War.

Old Lace

Old Man Logan

Omega

Inhuman

Michael Pointer

Omega Red

Omega the Unknown

Omerta

Omertà (Paul "Paulie" Provenzano) is a fictional character, a mutant appearing in American comic books published by Marvel Comics. The character is featured in the Eve of Destruction story arc in Uncanny X-Men.

Paulie first appears in the Eve of Destruction storyline, beginning in Uncanny X-Men #392.

After just being discharged from the United States Marines, Paul Provenzano returns to his home in Brooklyn, where he attempts to take over the local 'chapter' of the Mafia. The three leaders, whom Paulie has known all his life, were meeting in a local bakery, a mob-owned business. The leader declared he would not be popular if he made a "made man" out of a mutant. Paulie explains he was taking over. At first they were amused by his declarations, then they shoot him. Paulie easily resists their bullets, then brutally injures the men.

Jean Grey surprises and lectures him on the seeming waste of using his powers to take over the local mob. Paulie correctly guesses that she is here to recruit him into the X-Men and agrees to join, if only to see her in her costume. Jean's intention is to recruit Paulie for a mission to Genosha, to rescue the rest of the X-Men from Magneto. (Uncanny X-Men 392)

Jean briefly leaves Paulie to enter the X-Mansion while she talks with Sunpyre on the front driveway. Their conversation is interrupted moments later as Paulie is thrown through the front doors, followed by Northstar. Paulie crudely states his objections to working with the openly gay Northstar. In their heated exchange, Paulie dares Northstar to hit him, counting on his invulnerability to protect him. Northstar's repeated blows delivered at superhuman speed, however, inflict a nosebleed on Paulie and render him unconscious. Throughout the storyline, Paulie regularly calls Northstar "Maple-Leaf" and insults him for his homosexuality. (Uncanny X-Men 392)

During the trip Genosha, Paul and teammate Hector Rendoza receive a telepathic 'crash course' in their mutant powers, allowing them better control and understanding.  Moments later Paul suggests that he and Jean enter the cargo bay for 'privacy'. As a rebuttal, she makes him perceive her as elderly and overweight, an unpleasant visual. He also participates in a telepathic jaunt into Dazzler's mind, to see what had recently ravaged the dimension she had arrived from. The attackers were childlike versions of the alternate reality Age of Apocalypse villains. This Paulie is one of the few people in current continuity to have an inkling of what had gone on in said alternate reality.

Paulie and the others end up in a Genoshan public square, attempting to rescue Professor Xaiver. The makeshift team battles Magneto. Paulie is convinced that Magneto has slain Dazzler, though this is later proven untrue. After diversionary taunting, the villain launches Paulie towards space, but Northstar saves him. This results in Paulie offering an apology for his behavior to Northstar.  Which Northstar accepts,  Magneto is soon subdued by the X-Man Wolverine.

Back at the X-Mansion, despite an offer to stay, most of the team, including Paulie, left.

Powers and abilities
Omertà has complete invulnerability and superhuman strength.
(Can lift up to 20 tonnes)

One-Above-All

The One-Above-All was created by Mark Waid and Mike Wieringo and first appeared in Fantastic Four #511. In his few appearances, he took the appearance of Jack Kirby, which may suggest he is the representation of the actual comic book writers inside the Marvel Multiverse.

The One-Above-All is the sole creator of all existence in the Marvel Multiverse and, possibly, the Omniverse. He is also the supervisor of the Living Tribunal.

When a pregnant Susan Storm feared for her husband's possible death at the hands of the "all-powerful" Silver Surfer, Uatu the Watcher tells her that there is only one true all-powerful being and that his only weapon is love. When Doctor Strange encountered Eternity, the abstract entity stated that only God is the ruler of all realities. When Thor compared his power with Odin and other gods and abstract entities, he notes that the Creator of All Universes must be far more powerful than all of his creations combined.

The Living Tribunal was stated to be the representative of the One whose might far exceeds that of Eternity. Master Order and Lord Chaos wished that the Supreme Will may smile upon Adam Warlock, who also described the Living Tribunal as the servant of the being above even the gods. When the Cosmic Cube Kubik met the Living Tribunal, the being also stated the same thing about himself and again when he undoes the destruction caused by Adam Warlock with the Infinity Stones. When Protégé tried to become the most powerful being in the existence, he was instead absorbed by the Living Tribunal, who stated that it was impossible to be more powerful than his supervisor and wished he may forgive Protégé.

When the Thing's soul was trapped in a place between life and death, the rest of the Fantastic Four located the Thing's soul and came across the One-Above-All, who restored the Thing back to life and promised to the team that new wonders would be discovered. When the Cosmic Ghost Rider was retconned into the story, the One-Above-All stated that the Rider was not one of his creations and denied him access to his room, leaving the Rider to talk to his actual creator who resembled Donny Cates and was also living in the same place as the One-Above-All. He then encouraged a grieving Peter Parker to keep his faith, even in the face of his Aunt May's death. When a bartender asks Mephisto about the nature of the Living Tribunal, the demon states that he is just the biggest kid in the playground compared to the principal.

One Below All

The One Below All is the "dark reflection" or evil manifestation of the One-Above-All, created by Al Ewing and Joe Bennett, and first appeared in The Immortal Hulk #5 in the form of Bruce Banner's father, Brian Banner, his agent. Alluded to as the qlippoth, or "Hulk", of God, the One Below All is a malevolent and destructive force; when it speaks, it states that "I howl through many mouths. I break with many hands. They are themselves, but they are also me. I have all the power you give me and my weapon is hate.", in contrast to the One-Above-All's statement that "I see through many eyes. I build with many hands. They are themselves, but they are also me. I am all-powerful. My only weapon is love.". The One Below All is alluded to as the source of all gamma mutations in the Marvel Universe.

The One Below All resides in the Below Place, which is the lowest layer of Hell. It, as well as the Below Place, is kept behind a metaphysical 'Green Door'. This was first discovered by Brian Banner in a dream. The One Below All is also assumed to be the reason Brian began to drink, lose his mind, and eventually kill his wife. When it came to the day of the first gamma bomb test, helmed by Bruce Banner, the One Below All's powers were released when the power of its detonation partially opened the Green Door and created the first gamma mutate, the Hulk.

The One Below All possessed Jailbait of the Riot Squad who lost control of her powers. When she died, her brother Hotshot had to hold a church hostage in order to perform the last rites of Jailbait. He claimed that Jailbait was possessed by the devil. Then the One Below All possessed Sasquatch after he was killed in a bar fight. This drove Sasquatch on a feral rampage until the Hulk defeated Sasquatch and drained the gamma energy out of him until Sasquatch regressed back to Walter Langkowski. Through this absorption of Sasquatch's gamma energy, the One Below All then transferred into Banner, mocking the Hulk from within Banner's mind with the image of Brian Banner. Brian's ghost was able to regain some control of himself and told the Hulk about the One Below All's plan to enter and control a host body.

The One Below All managed to gain control of the Absorbing Man's body through an experimental procedure using gamma radiation to make him strong enough to fight the Hulk. When his soul encountered the One Below All, the Absorbing Man was unable to comprehend its true form, so much so that his physical body was possessed and split in half, and made its way to the site of the first gamma bomb detonation. While fighting the Hulk, The One Below All absorbed a great deal of his gamma energy, rendering him weak and misshapen. The two reached a stalemate, with the Hulk reabsorbing energy only for the Absorbing Man to take it back again, until Puck uses a specialised weapon to blast a hole through the Hulk's chest, while the Absorbing Man escapes. Using the ambient gamma radiation from the gamma bomb's detonation, The One Below All uses the Absorbing Man to open the Green Door and plunges New Mexico into the Below Place.

After the Hulk and Bruce Banner split apart, the One Below All appears in its 'true' green cloud form as it prepares to take over the rest of Earth. When the Hulk opposes its plan, the One Below All unleashes demons, shaped like the empty 'husks' of people, on him, one in particular the husk of General Ross, which transforms into a husk of the Red Hulk to fight. With help from the Absorbing Man and Puck, the Hulk was able to reabsorb the Absorbing Man's gamma radiation and use his thunder clap to disperse the One Below All's cloud form and end his threat to the world.

Doctor Strange later spoke to Mephisto about removing the One Below All's possession from the Hulk after the brief Defenders reunion. Mephisto, however, states that the One Below All is far stronger than he is.

A flashforward to the end of the Marvel Universe shows the One Below All still controlling the body of the Hulk and consuming the sentience of the cosmos, forcibly taking on the same role as Galactus for the next iteration of the Multiverse and becoming the "Breaker of Worlds".

During the "Absolute Carnage" storyline, Bruce Banner had a theory that Knull can either be an aspect of the One Below All or a creature that it controls.

In the final issues of The Immortal Hulk, as well as its one-shot Time of Monsters and spinoff one-shot Empyre: The Immortal She-Hulk, it is shown how the One Below All brings anyone mutated with gamma radiation to the Below-Place, with the first human to be so being Tammuz from Jordan, 9500 BCE. Later, gamma-mutated scientists Brian Banner and Samuel Sterns (the Leader), both enemies to Bruce Banner, were transported to the Below-Place via the Green Door where they both were merged into a being Sterns was primarily in control of and called after his own alias, the Leader. The being was tasked to destroy Bruce Banner.

After the Leader imprisoned the Banner persona (from his own mindscape) in the Below-Place, the Hulk and Joe Fixit personas controlled his body and fought the Avengers. After that, he encountered the Fantastic Four who transported him via the Forever Gate to the Below-Place, where the personas separate and meet the Banner persona. They fight the Leader and destroy him, freeing Sterns. Finally, the two personas ask the One Below All about the reason for the Hulk's existence and demand to show his actual face behind the clouds. The One Below All agrees and the green clouds are replaced and outshined by a yellow glowing light coming from the One-Above-All, who reveals himself to be simultaneously serving as the embodiment of creation and all good and of destruction and all evil. The One-Above-All says the Hulk's existence is a necessity and that the latter serves as a counterweight to other, lesser good. He tells that the Hulk can be what it chooses to be: strong and ruthless, or forbearing and humane. In the case of what to do with Sterns, who laid on the ground beside him, the Hulk decides that he is to be forgiven. Afterwards, the Fantastic Four brought all three personas, now together in the body of Bruce Banner,  as well as Sterns, back to Earth.

Onyxx

Ooze

Opal Tanaka
Opal Tanaka is known primarily as the former girlfriend of Bobby Drake (Iceman), a member of the mutant superhero team called the X-Men. Tanaka was first introduced in issue #51 of X-Factor in February 1990, created by Louise Simonson and Terry Shoemaker. Opal Tanaka lives in New York City and when X-Factor's ship takes up residence in the city, it blocks the sunlight that would strike her apartment, causing her plants to wilt. She encounters Iceman, who had come into the music store where she works, and expresses her views to him. Bobby, smitten with her, asks her out. Intrigued by Bobby, she accepts.

Opsidian

Optoman

Oracle

Oracle is a Shi'ar who is a member of the Shi'ar Imperial Guard. The character, created by writer Chris Claremont and artist Dave Cockrum, first appeared in The Uncanny X-Men #107 (October 1977). Oracle, whose alter-ego is Lady Sybil, has telepathy and can exert control over others' minds. Using this power, she can project stun bolts. She also has psychoscopic awareness, or "Mind-Sight": the ability to expand her over-consciousness to read the impressions left by events in the fabric of time and matter. Like many original members of the Imperial Guard, Oracle is the analog of a character from DC Comics' Legion of Super-Heroes: in her case Saturn Girl. Oracle is originally romantically linked with fellow Imperial Guardsman Starbolt; she is later engaged to marry Flashfire (an analog of Lightning Lad, to whom Saturn Girl was also romantically linked).

Part of the division of the Imperial Guard known as the Superguardians, Oracle is amongst the first of the Imperial Guard encountered by the team of superhuman mutant adventurers known as the X-Men who sought to rescue the Princess-Majestrix Lilandra Neramani from her insane brother, then-Majestor D'Ken. After the battle, Lilandra takes over as Majestrix, and the Guard swears allegiance to her.

Later, a renegade faction of the Imperial Guard become traitors, deciding to serve Lord Samédàr, Deathbird, and the Brood in their conspiracy to overthrow Shi'ar Princess-Majestrix Lilandra. Oracle is one of the faction of the Guard that remains loyal to Lilandra and, with the X-Men's help, battles the renegades.

Deathbird succeeds in a second coup attempt. Oracle is with the Guard when they come into conflict with a rogue Space Knight named Pulsar and an alien named Tyreseus. After a large battle which also involves Rom and other Space Knights — which leads to the deaths of four new Guardsman — Pulsar and Tyreseus are defeated.

Empress Deathbird commands the entire Imperial Guard, including Oracle, to fight the combined forces of the Starjammers and Excalibur on Earth so that she can claim the power of the Phoenix Force for herself. The Guard are forced to retreat when Deathbird is put in danger. (Some time later War Skrulls impersonating Charles Xavier and the Starjammers depose Deathbird and restore Lilandra Neramani to the throne. Deathbird cedes the empire back to Lilandra as she has grown bored of the bureaucracy.)

Oracle is again part of the mission during Operation: Galactic Storm, an intergalactic war between the Shi'ar and the Kree. The Imperial Guard are integral to the Sh'iar creating a massive super weapon — the "Nega-Bomb" — using Kree artifacts, including the original Captain Marvel's Nega-Bands, which the Guard steals from the dead hero's tomb. This bomb is capable of devastating an area equivalent to that of the Kree Empire (which is supposedly located throughout the Large Magellanic Cloud). Ultimately, the Nega Bomb device is successfully detonated, devastating the Kree Empire, with billions dying instantaneously (98% of the Kree population). The Shi'ar annex the remnants of the Kree Empire, with Deathbird becoming viceroy of the Kree territories.

Oracle has many further adventures with the Imperial Guard, in storylines involving Ronan the Accuser and the Inhumans, and such storylines as "Emperor Vulcan," "Secret Invasion," X-Men: Kingbreaker, "War of Kings," "Realm of Kings," the "Infinity" crossover, the "Trial of Jean Grey," "Time Runs Out," and the return of Thanos.

Orator

Orb

Drake Shannon

Agent of Zadkiel

Orbit

Orchid

Ord

Orka

Orphan

Orphan-Maker

Orrgo

Ismael Ortega

Emily Osborn

Emily Osborn is a supporting character in Marvel Comics. The character, created by J. M. DeMatteis and Sal Buscema, first appeared (as a photo) in The Spectacular Spider-Man #180 (September 1991). She was Norman Osborn's wife and Harry Osborn's mother.

She was apparently the only person that Norman ever showed love to, but their son's birth had weakened her with her dying sometime after.

However, Emily turns up alive where she faked her death and poses as "Emma", a nanny hired by Liz Allan to be there for Normie Osborn and Stanley Osborn. She later took blood samples of her grandchildren for unknown reasons.

During the "Go Down Swinging" storyline, Emily finds out that the Red Goblin is coming after their grandchildren. To keep Normie and Stanley safe, Emily abducts the two. Liz had tracking chips placed in the children as Liz, Mark Raxton and Harry find the children and discover that "Emma" is actually Emily. When the Red Goblin attacks, Emily gets away with Harry, Liz, Mark, Normie and Stanley while the Red Goblin fights with two Spider individuals as well as the Human Torch and Clash. When the Red Goblin defeats the group and catches up with the Osborn family, Emily witnesses the Red Goblin place a fragment on the Carnage symbiote on Normie. When the Red Goblin throws Emily through the window, she is saved by Spider-Man. Emily leaves the area with Stanley. Following the Red Goblin's defeat, Emily meets up with the rest of the Osborn family at Alchemax where she's forgiven for abandoning her family.

Alternate versions of Emily Osborn
The Ultimate Marvel version is renamed Martha Osborn. Martha is killed by a muscular, grotesque, demonic-like monster who was actually her husband.

Emily Osborn in other media
 Emily Osborn is alluded in the 2002 movie Spider-Man. It is implied by Norman that he and Emily had an acrimonious divorce as he talks to Harry about his new relationship with Mary Jane. A picture of her can be seen. 
 Emily Osborn has non-voiced appearances in The Spectacular Spider-Man animated series (intended to have been voiced by Marina Sirtis). This depiction doesn't appear interested in anything that's going on around her. She appears in the episodes "Competition", "Blueprints" and "Final Curtain".
 Emily Osborn appears in the 2011 musical Spider-Man: Turn Off the Dark. 
 Emily Osborn is mentioned in the 2018 Spider-Man video game. Pictures of her can be seen throughout Norman Osborn's apartment and a recording to her can be found. Prior to the game, she died of complications from Oshtoran Syndrome. Harry Osborn had wanted to be an environmental attorney like his mother and it is later revealed that he himself is also dying from the same disease that claimed his mother, leading to Norman working tirelessly to find a cure leading to the development of the Devil's Breath virus, presumably as Norman cannot bear losing his son like he lost his wife.

Harry Osborn

Norman Osborn

Normie Osborn

Oshtur

Osiris

Otomo

Outlaw

Nigel Higgins

Inez Temple

Outlaw Kid

Overdrive

Overkill

Overmind

Ozone

Owl

Ox

Raymond Bloch

Ronald Bloch

Oya

Ozymandias
A fictional ancient Egyptian warlord enslaved by Apocalypse.

References

Marvel Comics characters: O, List of